Ermengarde or Erembourg of Maine, also known as Erembourg de la Flèche (died 1126), was Countess of Maine and the Lady of Château-du-Loir from 1110 to 1126.  She was the daughter of Elias I, Count of Maine, and Mathilda of Château-du-Loire, daughter of Gervais II, Lord of Château-du-Loir. She was grandmother of King Henry II of England

In 1109 she married the Angevin heir, Fulk V, called "Fulk the Younger", thereby finally bringing Maine under Angevin control.  She gave birth to:
 Geoffrey Plantagenet, Count of Anjou (d. 1151)
 Elias II, Count of Maine (d. 1151)
 Matilda of Anjou (d. 1154), who married William Adelin, the son and heir to Henry I of England. After his death in the White Ship disaster of 1120, she became a nun and later Abbess of Fontevrault.
 Sibylla of Anjou (d. 1165), married in 1121 to William Clito, and then (after an annulment in 1124) to Thierry, Count of Flanders

She died in 1126, on either 15 January or 12 October.  After her death, Fulk the Younger left his lands to their son Geoffrey, and set out for the Holy Land, where he married Melisende, Queen of Jerusalem and became King of Jerusalem.

External links
Eremburge de la Flèche  (in French)

Counts of Maine
Countesses of Anjou
1090s births

1126 deaths

Year of birth uncertain
12th-century women rulers
11th-century French people 
11th-century French women  
12th-century French people 
12th-century French women